Carlos María Ariz Bolea (December 6, 1928 – August 29, 2015) was a Catholic bishop.

Born in Marcilla, Spain, Ariz Bolea was named bishop of the Vicar Apostolic of Darién, Panama, in 1981. In 1985, he was named bishop of the Catholic Diocese of Colón-Kuna Yala, Panama, retiring in 2005,

Notes

1928 births
2015 deaths
20th-century Roman Catholic bishops in Panama
Roman Catholic bishops of Colón-Kuna Yala